Richardson's ray (Bathyraja richardsoni) is a skate of the family Arhynchobatidae, found in the Atlantic Ocean and around Cook Strait in New Zealand, at depths of from 1,300 to 2,500 m.  Their length can reach 1.75 m. Dorsal and ventral surfaces of the disc are uniformly covered with dermal denticles, but lack thorns on the disc. The tail has 18 moderately sized thorns.

Conservation status 
The New Zealand Department of Conservation has classified the Richardson's ray as being "Not Threatened" but with the qualifier "Data Poor" under the New Zealand Threat Classification System.

References

Bathyraja
Taxa named by Jack Garrick
Fish described in 1961